The slaty-backed thrush (Geokichla schistacea) is a passerine bird in the  Asian thrush genus. It is found in the Tanimbar Islands.

References

slaty-backed thrush
Birds of the Tanimbar Islands
slaty-backed thrush